En Vivo is a live recording made on the 26 and 27 August 2005 in ND Ateneo, Buenos Aires, Argentina by the Selección Nacional de Tango a reunion of some of the best-known tango performers in the country with the musicians alternating between the roles of performer and arranger, which is unusual in tango. The album won the Premios Gardel for best tango album in 2007.

Track listing

Personnel
The arrangements were by violinist Mauricio Marcelli, Ernesto Baffa, bandoneon players Leopoldo Federico, Rodolfo Mederos and Walter Ríos and pianist Nicolas Ledesma all of whom played on the album along with violinists Damián Bolotín, Eduardo Walczak, Mario Abramovich and Pablo Agri, viola player Mario Fiocca, cellist Diego Sánchez, bandoneonists Pablo Mainetti and Horacio Romo and bassist Horacio Cabarcos.

References

Tango albums
2007 live albums